Royal Air Force Twinwood Farm or more simply RAF Twinwood Farm is a former Royal Air Force satellite station located  north of Bedford, Bedfordshire, England. For the majority of World War II, the airfield was home to RAF night fighters.

Royal Air Force use

Twinwood Farm opened in mid 1941 when the RAF began to use the grassed field.  By April 1942 it had three concrete runways and additional temporary buildings.

From then until the end of the war the Bristol Blenheims, Bristol Beaufighters, Bristol Beauforts, Douglas Bostons and de Havilland Mosquitoes of No. 51 Operational Training Unit used 'Twinwoods', as it was generally known.

In March 1943 North American Mustangs belonging to 164, 169, 239 and 208 Squadrons RAF engaged in Operation Spartan which occurred between 1 and 12 March 1943 was conducted across southern and central England to test a wide range of procedures and tactics of British and Canadian Forces.

Units
No. 26 Squadron RAF
No. 268 Squadron RAF
No. 613 Squadron RAF
No. 169 Squadron RAF
No. 239 Squadron RAF
No. 164 Squadron RAF
No. 14 Service Flying Training School RAF
 No. 19 Air Crew Holding Unit
No. 2837 Squadron RAF Regiment
Airborne Interception Conversion Flight RAF

United States Army Air Forces use
In 1944 the airfield was transferred to the U.S. Eighth Air Force and operated in conjunction with the nearby RAF Thurleigh.

Major Glenn Miller, U.S. Army (Air Corps)

Major Alton Glenn Miller, Air Corps, Army of the United States, commanded the Army Air Forces Band (Special), assigned to Supreme Headquarters, Allied Expeditionary Forces, formerly known as the Second AAF Radio Production Unit and Army Air Forces Training Command Orchestra in the United States. At the request of Gen. Eisenhower, Miller and his unit deployed to the European Theater during June 1944 for the missions of allied radio broadcasting and personal appearances. Miller and his unit were stationed with the Eighth Air Force Service Command (VIII AFSC) near Bedford for the purpose of broadcasting from the BBC facilities there, although the unit also broadcast from London.   Meanwhile, they appeared at many air bases across the UK. 

By December 1944, SHAEF was moving the unit from England to France, and ordered Miller ahead to complete arrangements. Scheduled flights from Bovingdon were canceled due to bad weather in France. On December 15, 1944, Miller accepted an invitation from Lt. Col. Norman Baessell of the VIII AFSC to ride with him to France aboard his UC-64 piloted by Flight Officer Stuart Morgan. Miller’s travel orders did not authorize him to board a “casual” flight and he did not report his intentions to his chain of command, so SHAEF was in the dark concerning Miller’s whereabouts. Although AAF and RAF combat missions flew that day, as well as numerous transport planes, the RAF Training Unit at Twinwood Field, near Bedford, had stood down. But the aerodrome was open. At 13:45 Morgan landed at Twinwood, boarded Baessell and Miller, and took off at 13:55. The UC-64 and its occupants were never seen again. The next morning, the Battle of the Bulge began. 

On January 20, 1945, an Eighth Air Force Board of Inquiry determined that the airplane went down over the English Channel due to a combination of human error, mechanical failure and weather. Remains of the UC-64 have never been found and Major Glenn Miller remains Missing In Action to the present day. The names of all three missing servicemen are inscribed in the Tablets of the Missing at Cambridge American Cemetery and Memorial. Major Miller is listed as Alton G. Miller.

Current use
The airfield closed in June 1945.

The site is now home to the Twinwood Arena, a large natural amphitheatre which plays host to various music festivals promoted by Twinwood Events including the Rhythm Festival.

Glenn Miller Museum
The Glenn Miller Museum is located in the restored control tower and features displays about Glenn Miller, RAF Twinwood Farm, and the Second World War.

Other buildings house different displays including:
 Twinwood Aviation Museum - featuring uniforms and artifacts recovered from German and Allied aircraft crash sites, as well as British aviation units and life in Britain during the war.
 Rooms of a 1940s family home
 Axis Museum - recreation of a German bunker, Russian and German artillery and weapons, and a display about Winston Churchill and the British Royal Family
 Fire Service Museum - recreated 1940s wartime fire station with uniforms, equipment and vehicles
 Displays of military vehicles
 
The group of museums are also known as Twinwood Airfield Museum, and are open seasonally.

See also

 List of former Royal Air Force stations
 Glenn Miller Orchestra

References

Citations

Bibliography

External links 

 Aerial photo of RAF Twinwood Farm from Multimap.Com
 Twinwood Farm historical photo album
 Twinwood Airfield Museum - site of Glenn Miller Museum (domain expired)
 Twinwood Airfield Bedfordshire. Wartime Airfield Layout 1944

Royal Air Force stations in Bedfordshire
Military aviation museums in England
Museums in Bedfordshire
World War II museums in the United Kingdom
Royal Air Force stations of World War II in the United Kingdom
Clapham, Bedfordshire